Fidkuiyeh (also Romanized as Fīdkū’īyeh and Fīd Kū’īyeh; also known as Bīd Kū”īyeh and Fītkū’īyeh) is a village in Khorramdasht Rural District, in the Central District of Kuhbanan County, Kerman Province, Iran. At the 2006 census, its population was 27, in 12 families.

References 

Populated places in Kuhbanan County